Brigadier General U.S. Army (ret) Michael C. Flowers, is a former commander of the Joint POW/MIA Accounting Command (JPAC).  The mission of JPAC is to achieve the fullest possible accounting of all Americans missing as a result of the nation's past conflicts. Michael C. Flowers is currently the Chief Operating Officer of DigiFlight, Inc. He has been with the company in several roles since 2008. He has been instrumental in the growth of DigiFlight’s Aerospace and Aviation business units and the overall continued growth for the company.

Mike was born at Ramey AFB in Aguadilla Puerto Rico. Flowers graduated from the University of Kansas in 1977 with a Bachelor of General Studies. In 1997, he earned a master's degree in public administration from Shippensburg University. He is also a graduate of the U.S. Army War College. Flowers has held a variety of command and staff positions throughout his 30+ years of service. He has also deployed to multiple military operations including Operation URGENT FURY (Grenada); Operations DESERT SHIELD and STORM Saudi Arabia and Iraq; and Operations RESTORE and UPHOLD DEMOCRACY (Haiti) and JOINT GUARDIAN (Kosovo).

Flowers' prior assignment was as the chief of staff, NATO Kosovo Force (KFOR), Pristina, Kosovo, from July 2004 until June 2005.  In July 1997, he assumed command of the 18th Aviation Brigade (Corps) (Airborne), XVIII Airborne Corps, Fort Bragg, North Carolina. He also served as the XVIII Airborne Corps aviation officer.  In July 1999, he relinquished command and served as the chief, Joint Exercises and Training, then later, Chief, Operations plans division, J-3, United States European Command, Stuttgart, Germany. Flowers then assumed the responsibilities of director, Center of Army Leadership, U.S. Army Command and General Staff College, Fort Leavenworth, Kansas, from August 2001 until June 2003. From that assignment, he became the director, human resources policy directorate, office of the deputy chief of staff, G-1, United States Army, Washington D.C.

Flowers' personal decorations include the Defense Superior Service Medal (three awards), the Legion of Merit (three awards), the Bronze Star Medal, the Defense Meritorious Service Medal, the Meritorious Service Medal (four awards) and the Air Medal. He also possesses the Senior Army Aviator Badge, the Master Parachutist Badge, French, German & British Parachutist Badge, and is Ranger qualified. He is rated in the UH60 Blackhawk, UH1 Huey, AH1 Cobra, OH58A/C Kiowa and OH58D Kiowa Warrior.

He has a wealth of experience in foreign negotiations and operations.  He has been a member of the Multi-National Force and Observers in Sinai, Egypt.  Below are two examples of his foreign negotiations.

On September 1, 2006, members of the Lao and U.S. delegations, led by Brigadier General Michael Flowers, including Ambassador Patricia Haslach and Mr. Southam Sakonhninhom conducted Consultative Talks in Vientiane, Laos.  These consultative talks, first held in 1989, form the basis of conducting JPAC search and recovery operations in the Lao PDR.

March 2006, U.S. and Vietnamese officials met in Hanoi, Vietnam recently for the second round of Technical Talks this year. The talks were led by Brig. Gen. Michael Flowers, Commander of the Joint POW/MIA Accounting Command.  The U.S. Ambassador to Vietnam, the Honorable Michael Marine, also participated in the talks along with DoD officials from Washington D.C. Vietnamese officials included the newly appointed director of the Vietnam Office for Seeking Missing Persons, Nguyen Ba Hung, along with officials from the Ministry of Foreign Affairs and Ministry of National Defense.

BG Flowers routinely hosted technical and consultative talks with senior officials worldwide to address topics specific to JPAC operations in those countries. JPAC negotiations ensure positive in-country conditions are maintained or established for investigative and recovery operations.

References
JPAC
 US Embassy Vientiane
 VFW
 General officers
 Veterans
 Mindspring
 Mindspring
 JPAC
 JPC
 DTIC
 Indiana ROTC
 Star Bulletin archives
 

Year of birth missing (living people)
Living people
University of Kansas alumni
American Senior Army Aviators
Shippensburg University of Pennsylvania alumni
United States Army generals
Recipients of the Legion of Merit